Robert Richard Sheehan (born January 11, 1949) is an American former professional ice hockey player, who played in the National Hockey League (NHL) and World Hockey Association (WHA) between 1969 and 1982 as a center.

Career
As a youth, Sheehan played in the inaugural 1960 Quebec International Pee-Wee Hockey Tournament with the junior Boston Bruins. A small player by hockey standards, Sheehan made up for his physical deficits by leading the NSJHL minor league with 64 goals his rookie year. He was drafted in the third round, 32nd overall by the Montreal Canadiens and went on to play parts of three seasons in the NHL. He was a reserve on the Canadiens Stanley Cup-champion team in 1971 and then joined the lowly California Golden Seals where he quickly became a regular and one of the top forwards for his new club. 

In 1972, Sheehan joined the New York Raiders of the World Hockey Association, who had obtained his WHA rights from the New England Whalers. In 1975–76, he returned to the NHL with the Chicago Black Hawks and would transfer between the NHL and American Hockey League (AHL) - plus another stop in the WHA - several times until his retirement in 1983.

After spending the entire 1978-79 regular season with the New Haven Nighthawks of the AHL, Sheehan was called up by the New York Rangers to center Pat Hickey and Ron Duguay in the playoffs, which ultimately led to the 1979 Stanley Cup Final, which they lost to the Montreal Canadiens in five games. In 15 playoff games, Sheehan had four goals and three assists, and incurred eight penalty minutes.

In a career-total 310 NHL games, Sheehan recorded 48 goals and 63 assists for 111 points.

International play
Sheehan represented the United States at the 1981 Ice Hockey World Championship tournament. He scored one goal and one assist in eight games.

Regular season and playoffs

International

Achievements & awards
MJrHL scoring champion (1966–67)
Played in WHA All-Star Game (1973, 1974)
AHL Second All-Star Team (1979)

References

External links

1949 births
Living people
American men's ice hockey centers
Binghamton Whalers players
California Golden Seals players
Chicago Blackhawks players
Colorado Rockies (NHL) players
Detroit Red Wings players
Edmonton Oilers (WHA) players
Fort Worth Texans players
Ice hockey players from Massachusetts
Indianapolis Racers players
Los Angeles Kings players
Montreal Canadiens draft picks
Montreal Canadiens players
Montreal Voyageurs players
New Haven Nighthawks players
Jersey Knights players
New York Golden Blades players
New York Raiders players
New York Rangers players
Rhode Island Reds players
Sportspeople from Weymouth, Massachusetts
St. Catharines Black Hawks players
Stanley Cup champions